Baron Guy François Edouard Marie Ullens de Schooten Whettnall (born 31 January 1935) is a Belgian art collector, philanthropist, and former businessperson.

Following his business career, he has with his wife, Myriam Ullens, established the Guy & Myriam Ullens Foundation, known for the Ullens Center for Contemporary Art in Beijing, China, and for founding the Ullens School in Lalitpur, Nepal.

Early life 
Guy Ullens was born in San Francisco, California, as the third child to Baron Jean Marie Joseph Anne Mathilde Alphonse Ullens de Schooten Whettnall (1897–1950), a Belgian diplomat, and a member of the noble family  of the Southern Netherlands. His mother was ethnographic photographer, writer, and Royal Geographical Society fellow, Baroness Marie Thérèse Pauline Francis Ullens de Schooten Whettnall née Wittouck (1905–89), of the Belgium noble family , a daughter of distilling and sugar magnate , who together with his brothers  and Paul Wittouck owned the Sugar refinery of Tienen.

The family moved to Oslo, Norway shortly after Guy was born, where Jean Ullens took up the diplomatic position of acting Minister for Belgium. Over the course of World War II, the family was confined to Berlin, and later lived in India, Pakistan, and Iran.

Education and career 
After a degree in law from the Catholic University of Louvain, Belgium, in 1958, Ullens obtained an MBA at Stanford University in 1960. He started Eurocan in Mechelen, Belgium, a company that specialized in the manufacture of metal packagings for preserved foods and beverages.

In 1973, he joined the management of the family company R. T. Holding, a conglomerate in food industries, and played as CEO a central role in the company's expansion into Asia. In 1989, the Raffinerie Tirlemontoise was sold to German company Südzucker in a €1 billion deal.

Proceeds from the sale were reinvested in food businesses via the holding company Artal Group, which Ullens served as president and CEO for. In 1999, following a change in strategy, Artal entered the textile industry buying French company Albert, and took control of Weight Watchers International in a US$735 million 1980s-style leveraged buyout in September 1999 buying from Heinz 94% of Weight Watchers' equity. Artal Group subsequently earned US$3.8 billion by selling stocks while retaining a 52% majority stake in Weight Watchers. Guy Ullens told Forbes in 2012, that the initial US$224 million direct investment in Weight Watchers had returned US$5.2 billion to Artal Group.

Philanthropic projects 
In 2000, Guy Ullens retired from business to devote himself to philanthropic projects with his wife, Myriam Ullens.

In 2002 they set up the Guy & Myriam Ullens Foundation. One of the first purposes of the Foundation was to sponsor and organize exhibitions of Chinese art, and to lend pieces to museums and cultural centres around the world.

Guy and Myriam Ullens helped children in Nepal by establishing orphanages and two intensive care centres for children with malnutrition. They also set up the Ullens School Kathmandu, partnering with the Bank Street College of Education to train Nepalese teachers. The Ullens School Kathmandu is the only school in Nepal to be IB certified.

When Myriam Ullens was diagnosed with cancer in 2003, Guy Ullens took over the development of the Nepal project.

Art collection 
In the early 1980s, Ullens initiated a collection of Chinese art that is one of the world's largest and by 2007 included nearly 1,700 pieces. The Ullens Collection is managed by the Guy and Myriam Ullens Foundation.

In 2007, the Foundation established the Ullens Center for Contemporary Art (UCCA) in the Dashanzi district of Beijing. In order to establish UCCA, Ullens sold off his collection of J. M. W. Turner watercolour paintings for £10.76 million at a Sotheby's auction in London in July 2007. UCCA was the first not-for-profit art centre in China dedicated to contemporary art.

In a Sotheby's Hong Kong auction in April 2011, exclusively featuring 106 works from the Ullens Collection, Zhang Xiaogang's 1988 triptych oil work Forever Lasting Love, of half-naked figures in an arid landscape suffused with mystical symbols, sold for HK$79 million (US$10.1 million), a record auction price for a contemporary artwork from China, in Hong Kong.

In October 2013, Sotheby's Hong Kong at the Asian Contemporary 40th Anniversary Sale, Ullens put up for sale Chen Yifei's political realist work Red Flag 1 (1971), and The Last Supper (2001) by contemporary Chinese artist Zeng Fanzhi. The Last Supper was sold for US$23.3 million, setting a new record for contemporary Asian artwork.

In 2016, Ullens, now in his 80s, announced that he was looking to hand over the UCCA and would sell his art collection at auction.

On 11 February 2017, the Ullens Center for Contemporary Art received the 2016 Global Fine Art Awards for Best Contemporary / Postwar / SoloArtist “Rauschenberg in China”.

Personal life 
Ullens married Micheline Franckx (1932–2015) in 1955. They had four children, and divorced in 1999.

In 1999, Ullens married Myriam "Mimi" Lechien (born 1952), a Belgian entrepreneur.

Ullens is a yachtsman, and owns the 170 ft (51.77 m) long flybridge aluminium sloop Red Dragon II with interior design by French architect Jean-Michel Wilmotte. Build by Alloy Yachts in New Zealand in 2007 and commissioned in 2008, the yacht was put up for sale for US$28 million in 2015.

Ullens lives in Verbier in south-western Switzerland in the canton of Valais, where he has been a member of the Verbier Festival foundation, and was, according to Het Laatste Nieuws, worth an estimated €250–330 million in 2012.

Honours 
Ullens was appointed Officer of the Legion of Honour on 4 June 2003, Commander of the Legion of Honor on 1 February 2010, and Commander of the Order of Leopold II on 5 October 2011.

References 

1935 births
Living people
People from San Francisco
Social entrepreneurs
Belgian businesspeople
Belgian philanthropists
Belgian art collectors